The 2016 BRD Bucharest Open was a professional tennis tournament played on red clay courts. It was the 3rd edition of the tournament and part of the 2016 WTA Tour. It took place at Arenele BNR in Bucharest, Romania between 11 and 17 July 2016.

Points and prize money

Point distribution

Prize money

Singles main-draw entrants

Seeds 

 1 Rankings as of June 27, 2016.

Other entrants 
The following players received wildcards into the main draw:
  Ioana Mincă
  Elena Gabriela Ruse 
  Francesca Schiavone

The following players received entry using a protected ranking:
  Vania King

The following players received entry from the qualifying draw:
  Misa Eguchi 
  Elitsa Kostova 
  Nadia Podoroska 
  Isabella Shinikova

The following player received entry as a lucky loser:
  Xu Shilin

Withdrawals 
Before the tournament
  Denisa Allertová → replaced by  Barbora Krejčiková
  Zarina Diyas → replaced by  Paula Kania
  Karin Knapp → replaced by  Sesil Karatantcheva
  Yulia Putintseva → replaced by  María Teresa Torró Flor
  Yaroslava Shvedova (viral illness) → replaced by  Xu Shilin
  Anna Tatishvili → replaced by  Polina Leykina

Retirements
  Francesca Schiavone (right shoulder injury)

Doubles main-draw entrants

Seeds 

 1 Rankings as of June 27, 2016.

Other entrants 
The following pairs received wildcards into the main draw:
  Cristina Dinu /  Elena Gabriela Ruse
  Irina Maria Bara /  Nicoleta Dascălu

Champions

Singles 

  Simona Halep def.  Anastasija Sevastova, 6–0, 6–0

Doubles 

  Jessica Moore /  Varatchaya Wongteanchai vs.  Alexandra Cadanțu /  Katarzyna Piter, 6–3, 7–6(7–5)

External links 
 
 

BRD Bucharest Open
BRD Bucharest Open
2016 in Romanian tennis
July 2016 sports events in Romania